Clarence Wiley "Doc" Spears (July 24, 1894 – February 1, 1964) was an American college football player, coach, and doctor. He was an All-American guard at Dartmouth College (1914–1915) and served as the head football coach at Dartmouth (1917–1920), West Virginia University (1921–1924), the University of Minnesota (1925–1929), the University of Oregon (1930–1931), the University of Wisconsin–Madison (1932–1935), the University of Toledo (1936–1942), and University of Maryland, College Park (1943–1944), compiling a career college football record of 148–83–14. Spears was inducted into the College Football Hall of Fame as a player in 1955.

Early life and playing career
Spears was born in DeWitt, Arkansas and attended high school in Kewanee, Illinois. He began his college career at Knox College in Galesburg, Illinois, where he competed in football and track and field during the 1912–13 academic year. He transferred to Dartmouth College in 1913. At Dartmouth, he played guard in football and was selected to the College Football All-America Team in 1914 and 1915.

Coaching career
Spears was the head coach for the Dartmouth Indians football team from 1917 to 1920. From 1921 to 1924, he coached the West Virginia Mountaineers football team, winning 79.5% of the games he coached during his tenure there. Following that, Spears coached the Minnesota Golden Gophers from 1925 to 1929, leading the team to a 6–0–2 record and a share of the Big Ten Conference title in 1927 He had a 28–9–3 record at Minnesota.

Spears was the coach at Oregon in 1930 and 1931. From 1932 to 1935 he coached the Wisconsin Badgers. From 1936 to 1942, Spears was Toledo's coach. Finally, he was the coach at Maryland in 1943 and 1944, tallying a mark of 5–12–1.

Spears had two undefeated seasons as a coach, 1922 at West Virginia and 1927 at Minnesota. In 1955, he was inducted into the College Football Hall of Fame.

Medical career
While coaching, Spears studied medicine at the University of Chicago and the Rush Medical College. Following his football career, he maintained a medical practice for many years.

Head coaching record

References

External links
 

1894 births
1964 deaths
American football guards
American football tackles
Dartmouth Big Green football coaches
Dartmouth Big Green football players
Knox Prairie Fire football players
Maryland Terrapins football coaches
Minnesota Golden Gophers football coaches
Oregon Ducks football coaches
Toledo Rockets athletic directors
Toledo Rockets football coaches
West Virginia Mountaineers football coaches
Wisconsin Badgers football coaches
College men's track and field athletes in the United States
All-American college football players
College Football Hall of Fame inductees
People from DeWitt, Arkansas
People from Kewanee, Illinois
Coaches of American football from Illinois
Players of American football from Illinois
Track and field athletes from Illinois